Tan Ah Eng (22 August 1955 – 10 August 2013) was a Malaysian politician. She was the Member of the Parliament of Malaysia for the Gelang Patah constituency in the state of Johor from 2004 to 2013. She was member of the Malaysian Chinese Association (MCA), a component party of ruling Barisan Nasional coalition then.

Tan was elected to federal Parliament in the 2004 election, succeeding fellow MCA member Teu Si @ Hang See Ten in the seat of Gelang Patah. She had earlier been a Senator.

Suffering brain cancer, she did not recontest her seat in the 2013 election, and died in August of that year, at the age of 58.

Election results

See also

 Gelang Patah (federal constituency)

References

1955 births
2013 deaths
People from Johor
Malaysian politicians of Chinese descent
Malaysian Chinese Association politicians
Members of the Dewan Negara
Members of the Dewan Rakyat
Women members of the Dewan Rakyat
Women in Johor politics
Women members of the Dewan Negara
Deaths from brain tumor
Deaths from cancer in Malaysia
21st-century Malaysian women politicians